Sergei Baltacha (born 28 July 1979) is a former footballer. Born in the USSR (now Ukraine), Baltacha represented Scotland at youth international level.

Club career
He first played football in the Dynamo Kiev academy, but began his professional career in Scotland, at St Mirren, where he gained 3 caps for the Scotland U-21 side. After a trial at Portsmouth he joined Millwall in January 2003 and was released a year later, after which he had an unsuccessful trial with Queen of the South, and St Johnstone before signing with Petershill in 2004. He retired from professional football in 2005/2006.

International career

Baltacha was eligible to play for Russia, Ukraine and under FIFA regulations at the time, the four Home nations as a British passport holder born outside of the United Kingdom with no British parental or grand-parental bloodlines. Baltacha Jr. had moved to the United Kingdom with his father, Sergei Pavlovich Baltacha, when he signed for Ipswich Town and at the age of 11 moved to Scotland when Baltacha Sr. signed for St Johnstone in May 1990. Having acquired a British passport, in 1999, he represented Scotland at U21 level against Lithuania.

Personal life
His father, Sergei, played football for the Soviet Union, his mother, Olga, was a pentathlete and his sister, Elena Baltacha, was the former British number one for Women's tennis.

References

External links

1979 births
Living people
Footballers from Kyiv
Scottish footballers
Scotland under-21 international footballers
Ukrainian footballers
Scottish people of Ukrainian descent
Ukrainian emigrants to the United Kingdom
Millwall F.C. players
Naturalised citizens of the United Kingdom
Scottish Football League players
Scottish Junior Football Association players
Scottish Premier League players
St Mirren F.C. players
Petershill F.C. players
English Football League players
Association football fullbacks